Maria Jadwiga Dziuba (born 2 January 1945) is a Polish farmer and politician from the Polish People's Party. She served as member of the Sejm from 2004 to 2005.

References

1945 births
Living people
People from Masovian Voivodeship
Polish People's Party politicians
Members of the Polish Sejm 2001–2005
Women members of the Sejm of the Republic of Poland
21st-century Polish women politicians